Zoco or Tsotso, also called Goicang is a township in Gar County, Ngari Prefecture of Tibet Autonomous Region of China.

See also
List of towns and villages in Tibet

References

Ngari Prefecture
Populated places in Tibet